I'm Just Me is the twelfth studio album by American country music artist Charley Pride. It was released in 1971 on the RCA Victor label (catalog no. LSP-4560).

The album was awarded three stars from the web site AllMusic. It debuted on Billboard magazine's country album chart on July 17, 1971, peaked at No. 1, and remained on the chart for 38 weeks. The album also included two No. 1 hit singles: "I'd Rather Love You" and "I'm Just Me".

Track listing

See also
 Charley Pride discography

References

1971 albums
Charley Pride albums
albums produced by Jack Clement
RCA Records albums